Stiliger is a genus of small and minute sacoglossan or sap-sucking sea slugs. They are marine gastropod mollusks in the family Limapontiidae.

They somewhat resemble nudibranchs, but are not closely related to them. They are a rich green in color, caused by the green algae they eat.

Species 
Species in the genus Stiliger include:
 Stiliger akkeshiensis Baba, 1935
 Stiliger auarita Caballer, Ortea & Moro, 2009
 Stiliger aureomarginatus Jensen, 1993
  Stiliger berghi Baba, 1937
 Stiliger costai Pruvot-fol, 1951 
 Stiliger fuscovittatus Lance, 1962 - brown-streak stiliger
 Stiliger illus Er. Marcus, 1965
 Stiliger llerae Ortea, 1981
 Stiliger ornatus Ehrenberg, 1831
 Stiliger viridis (Kelaart, 1858)
 Stiliger vossi Ev. Marcus and Er. Marcus, 1960

Species brought into synonymy 
 Stiliger amphibius Allman, 1845: synonym of Alderia modesta (Lovén, 1844)
 Stiliger bellulus (Orgibny, 1837): synonym of Calliopaea bellula d'Orbigny, 1837
 Stiliger boodleae Baba, 1938: synonym of Ercolania boodleae (Baba, 1938)
 Stiliger cricetus Er. Marcus & Ev. Marcus, 1970: synonym of Ercolania coerulea Trinchese, 1892 
 Stiliger erbsus Ev. Marcus & Er. Marcus, 1970: synonym of Ercolania erbsus (Ev. Marcus & Er. Marcus, 1970) (original combination)
 Stiliger felinus (Hutton, 1882): synonym of Ercolania felina (F. W. Hutton, 1882)
 Stiliger formicarius Baba, 1959: synonym of Costasiella formicaria (Baba, 1959)
 Stiliger fuscatus Gould, 1870: synonym of Ercolania fuscata (Gould, 1870)
 Stiliger gopalai Rao, 1937: synonym of Ercolania gopalai (Rao, 1937) 
 Stiliger lilianae Ev. Marcus & Er. Marcus, 1969 : synonym of Costasiella ocellifera (Simroth, 1895)
 Stiliger llerai Ortea, 1981: synonym of Stiliger llerae Ortea, 1981
 Stiliger mariae (Meyer & Möbius, 1865): synonym of Calliopaea bellula d'Orbigny, 1837
 Stiliger modestus Lovén, 1844: synonym of Alderia modesta (Lovén, 1844)
 Stiliger niger Lemche, 1935: synonym of Ercolania nigra (Lemche, 1935)
 Stiliger nigrovittatus Rao & Rao, 1963: synonym of Ercolania raorum (Ev. Marcus & Er. Marcus, 1970) (Invalid: junior secondary homonym of Stiliger nigrovittatus (A. Costa, 1866); Stiliger raorum is a replacement name)
 Stiliger noto Baba, 1959: synonym of Hermaea noto (Baba, 1959)
 Stiliger oophaga (Lemche, 1972): synonym of Calliopaea oophaga Lemche in Gascoigne & Sartory, 1974
 Stiliger pica Annandale & Prashad, 1922: synonym of Ercolania pica (Annandale & Prashad, 1922)
 Stiliger pusillus Baba, 1959: synonym of Calliopaea pusilla (Baba, 1968)
 Stiliger scaldianus (Nyst, 1855): synonym of Alderia modesta (Lovén, 1844)
 Stiliger smaragdinus Baba, 1949: synonym of Sacoproteus smaragdinus (Baba, 1949) as type species of the genus Sacoproteus
 Stiliger subviridis Baba, 1959: synonym of Ercolania subviridis (Baba, 1959)
 Stiliger talis Ev. Marcus & Er. Marcus, 1956: synonym of Ercolania talis (Ev. Marcus & Er. Marcus, 1956) (original combination)
 Stiliger tentaculatus Eliot, 1917: synonym of Ercolania tentaculata'' (Eliot, 1917) (original combination)
 Stiliger vanellus Er. Marcus, 1957: synonym of Ercolania fuscata (Gould, 1870)
 Stiliger varians Eliot, 1904: synonym of Ercolania varians (Eliot, 1904)
 Stiliger vesiculosus (Deshayes, 1853): synonym of Calliopaea bellula d'Orbigny, 1837
 Stiliger zosterae Baba, 1959: synonym of Hermaea zosterae (Baba, 1959)

References

 Powell A W B, New Zealand Mollusca, William Collins Publishers Ltd, Auckland, New Zealand 1979 
 Jensen K.R. (2007) Biogeography of the Sacoglossa (Mollusca, Opisthobranchia). Bonner Zoologische Beiträge 55:255–281
 
 Many images of Stiliger'' species 

Limapontiidae
Taxa named by Christian Gottfried Ehrenberg